Peninsula Grammar, formerly The Peninsula School, is an Australian independent, co-educational, Anglican, day and boarding school located in Mount Eliza, Victoria.

Founded in 1961, originally as a boys-only school, Peninsula Grammar began enrolling girls from 1994.  It is a member of the Associated Grammar Schools of Victoria. The school has a non-selective enrolment policy and caters for approximately 1,190 students from Kindergarten to Year 12. Co-educational from 1994 and an Anglican school, Peninsula's chaplain for twenty-four years (1974 -1998) - the Rev. John Leaver - initiated the founding of  several  other similar Anglican or Ecumenical  co-educational schools in Victoria.

Houses
 Ansett, royal purple
 Carr, navy blue
 Clarke, red
 Country, gold
 Newton, green
 Town, sky blue

Sport 
Peninsula Grammar is a member of the Associated Grammar Schools of Victoria (AGSV).

AGSV and AGSV/APS premierships 
Peninsula Grammar has won the following AGSV & AGSV/APS premierships.

Boys:

 Athletics (4) - 2004, 2005, 2006, 2007
 Badminton (2) - 1994, 1995
 Basketball - 2007
 Cricket (5) - 1976, 1989, 1990, 1992, 2016
 Cross Country - 1990
 Golf (2) - 1994, 1995
 Hockey - 1991
 Squash - 1994
 Tennis (13) - 1977, 1980, 1985, 1987, 1992, 1993, 1996, 1998, 2004, 2008, 2009, 2010, 2020
 Volleyball (3) - 1999, 2004, 2011

Girls:

 Athletics (12) - 2002, 2003, 2004, 2005, 2006, 2007, 2008, 2010, 2011, 2012, 2013, 2015
 Basketball - 2013
 Cross Country (12) - 2004, 2005, 2006, 2007, 2008, 2010, 2011, 2012, 2013, 2014, 2015, 2016
 Netball - 2007
 Swimming (3) - 2006, 2007, 2008
 Tennis (2) - 2003, 2004

Alumni 
Simon Binks – musician
Belle Brockhoff – Olympic Athlete
Ryan Broekhoff – basketball player
Andrew Daddo – actor
Cameron Daddo – actor
Lochie Daddo – actor
Jarrad Grant – Western Bulldogs AFL footballer
Billy Hartung (footballer) – Hawthorn AFL footballer (Number 23 AFL Draft Pick for the 2014 season)
Oliver Hayes-Brown – basketball player
David Hille – Essendon AFL footballer
Rob Hulls – Victorian Attorney General
Greg Hunt – Liberal member for Flinders from 2001 until his retirement in May 2022
Simon Hussey - ARIA award composer/recording producer for James Reyne and Daryl Braithwaite
Sammy J – comedian
Nathan Jones – Melbourne AFL footballer
Matson Lawson – Australian representative to the 2012 Olympics in swimming
Stewart Loewe – former St Kilda AFL footballer
John McCarthy – Port Adelaide AFL footballer
Bryce McGain – Australian cricketer

Peter Mitchell – Channel 7 News presenter
Mick Molloy – comedian
Grace O'Sullivan – actress, known for her role as Olivia Lane on Neighbours
James Rees – entertainer and host of Giggle and Hoot
David Reyne – musician and actor
James Reyne – musician
Brad Robinson – musician
Tim Ross - comedian/ radio presenter for Nova 100.3fm 
Jackie Sannia  – musician and producer (finalist on The Voice Australia 2013 season) 
James Sorensen – actor
Dale Stevenson – Australian representative to the 2012 Olympics in athletics
Matt Tilley – radio presenter
Jacob Weitering - Carlton AFL footballer (number 1 draft pick for the 2015 season)
Lachie Whitfield – Greater Western Sydney AFL footballer (Number 1 AFL Draft Pick for the 2013 season)
Claudia Whitfort – St Kilda AFLW footballer
Tim Wilson – Liberal Party MP and former Australian Human Rights Commissioner

International Program 
In addition to catering for the boarding of international students (notably from the P.R.C., South Korea and Vietnam), Peninsula Grammar operates multiple overseas campuses, largely in South East Asia.

See also 
 List of schools in Victoria
 List of high schools in Victoria
 Victorian Certificate of Education

References

External links
Official website

Anglican secondary schools in Melbourne
Anglican primary schools in Melbourne
Associated Grammar Schools of Victoria
Boarding schools in Victoria (Australia)
Educational institutions established in 1961
Junior School Heads Association of Australia Member Schools
1961 establishments in Australia
Buildings and structures in the Shire of Mornington Peninsula